A. P. Indian (foaled May 6, 2010 ) is an American Thoroughbred racehorse and the winner of the 2016 Belmont Sprint Championship Stakes.

Career
Owned and bred by Richard & Sue Masson's Green Lantern Stables LLC, A. P. Indian's first race was on October 8th, 2012 at Delaware Park Racetrack where he came in first. He also won his second race on September 6th, 2013, this time at Churchill Downs.

A. P. Indian got his first stakes win at the May 9, 2015 Decathlon Stakes and won both the 2015 and 2016 editions of the Donald LeVine Memorial Stakes.

He got his first graded win on July 9, 2016 at the Belmont Sprint Championship Stakes.

He then won a series of graded races throughout 2016, with wins at the Alfred G. Vanderbilt Handicap, the Forego Handicap and the Phoenix Stakes, which was ultimately his final win.

He competed in the 2016 Breeders' Cup Sprint, coming in third and then finished his career with a second-place finish in the 2017 Maryland Sprint Handicap.

A. P. Indian was retired on July 31, 2017 after an ankle injury.

Pedigree

References

2010 racehorse births